The 43rd Golden Globe Awards, honoring the best in film and television for 1985, were held on January 24, 1986.

Winners and nominees

Film 

The following films received multiple nominations:

The following films received multiple wins:

Television

The following programs received multiple nominations:

The following programs received multiple wins:

Ceremony

Presenters 

 June Allyson
 Shari Belafonte
 Gary Busey
 Barbara Carrera
 Diahann Carroll
 Richard Chamberlain
 Natalie Cole
 Bette Davis
 William Devane
 Kirk Douglas
 Patty Duke
 Faye Dunaway
 Janie Fricke
 Louis Gossett, Jr.
 Raul Julia
 Gladys Knight
 Shelley Long
 Howie Mandel
 Kristy McNichol
 Julia Migenes
 Chuck Norris
 Jennifer O'Neill
 Lou Rawls
 Carl Reiner
 Cesar Romero
 Robert Stack
 Peter Strauss

See also
 58th Academy Awards
 6th Golden Raspberry Awards
 37th Primetime Emmy Awards
 38th Primetime Emmy Awards
 39th British Academy Film Awards
 40th Tony Awards
 1985 in film
 1985 in American television

References
 IMDb - 1986 Golden Globe Awards

043
1985 film awards
1985 television awards
January 1986 events in the United States
Golden Globe